Carano may refer to:

 Carano, municipality in Trentino in the northern Italian region Trentino-Alto Adige/Südtirol
 Gina Carano, American actress and former mixed martial artist
 Glenn Carano, a former American football quarterback

See also 

 Cerano